Mehdiabad (also Romanized as Mehdīābād) is a village in Montazeriyeh Rural District, in the Central District of Tabas County, South Khorasan Province, Iran. At the 2006 census, its population was 136, in 28 families.

References 

Populated places in Tabas County